Donald Kay (c. 1920 – April 2007 ) was an alderman on Ottawa City Council for 18 years.

Before entering politics, Kay was an administrative officer for the Federal Post Office Department. He was also the chairman of the council of the Community Association of Southeast Ottawa. He was also the first Vice President of the Elmvale Acres-Urbandale Community Association. Later on in his career, he was a regional representative of the Public Service Alliance. 

Kay, a civil servant, first ran for council in 1960. Running in Gloucester Ward, he placed fourth. In his second attempt, the following election, Kay would be elected, unseating incumbent Pat Doherty for the second elected position in Gloucester Ward. Kay represented Gloucester Ward until 1966, when he was elected in the new Alta Vista Ward. In 1968, he also became a regional councillor in addition to sitting on Ottawa City Council. In 1975, he became the Dean of the City Council. In the 1980 election, Kay was defeated in the new Canterbury Ward by Conservative school teacher Darrel Kent. Kay had been charged for public mischief after one of Kent's signs was vandalised.

Sources
Ottawa Citizen, December 1, 1962
Ottawa Citizen, December 2, 1974
Ottawa Citizen, November 11, 1980

References

2007 deaths
Ottawa city councillors
Year of birth uncertain